The 2018 VTV Awards (Vietnamese: Ấn tượng VTV - Sắc màu 2018) is a ceremony honouring the outstanding achievement in television on the Vietnam Television (VTV) network from August 2017 to July 2018. It took place on September 7, 2018 in Hanoi and hosted by Minh Hà & Thành Trung.

Winners and nominees
(Winners denoted in bold)

Presenters

Special performances

References

External links

2018 television awards
VTV Awards
2018 in Vietnamese television
September 2018 events in Vietnam